Merrill Auditorium is a 1,908-seat auditorium located in Portland, Maine, United States. Originally known as Portland City Hall Auditorium, it is located in the eastern section of Portland City Hall.

The auditorium was built in 1912 and underwent a major rebuild and renovation in 1997. It features a large pipe organ, the Hermann Kotzschmar Memorial Organ, donated by Cyrus Curtis and built by the Austin Organ Company (Opus 323). It was renamed in the 1990s following a bequest which allowed the facility to be renovated.

Prime tenants at Merrill are the Portland Symphony Orchestra, Portland Ovations and the Friends of the Kotzschmar Organ. Resident organizations include the Maine State Ballet, Portland Ballet and Opera Maine.

References

External links
Merrill Auditorium details on the Portland Public Assembly Facilities Division website
Seating Chart for Merrill Auditorium 
A history of the Kotzschmar organ
Portland Ovations, a nonprofit organization, and the primary presenter at Merrill Auditorium
Portland Symphony Orchestra
PortTIX is the official box office of the Merrill Auditorium.

Concert halls in the United States
Music venues in Portland, Maine
Public venues with a theatre organ
Theatres completed in 1912
1912 establishments in Maine